The Deputy Chief Minister of Uttar Pradesh is a member of the Cabinet of Uttar Pradesh Government in the Government of Uttar Pradesh. Not a constitutional office, it seldom carries any specific powers. A deputy chief minister usually also holds a cabinet portfolio such as home minister or finance minister. In the parliamentary system of government, the Chief Minister is treated as the "first among equals" in the cabinet; the position of deputy chief minister is used to bring political stability and strength within a coalition government. 
The post of Deputy Chief Minister is a kind of informal post, which is not mentioned in the Constitution. It works like an ordinary cabinet minister. The appointment of Deputy Chief Minister is done by the ruling party only to maintain balance in the political situation. There is no fixed number for the post of Deputy Chief Minister, in any state it can be made two, three or even more. For example, in 1998, Madhya Pradesh had two deputy chief ministers, Subhash Yadav and Jamuna Devi, under Chief Minister Digvijay Singh. Similarly, after the 2017 Uttar Pradesh assembly elections, two Deputy Chief Ministers Dinesh Sharma  and Keshav Prasad Maurya were appointed under Chief Minister Yogi Adityanath to correct the electoral equations. Babu Narain Singh Gurjar was first Deputy Chief Minister of Uttar Pradesh.

List of Deputy Chief Ministers

See also 
 List of current Indian deputy chief ministers

References

Deputy chief ministers of Uttar Pradesh
Uttar Pradesh
Lists of people from Uttar Pradesh
Uttar Pradesh politics-related lists